Bianca Maree Netzler (born 27 May 1976 in Goulburn, New South Wales) is a female field hockey midfield player from Australia, who made her debut for the Australian women's national team at the Indira Gandhi Gold Cup in 1996. She was a member of the Hockeyroos at the 2004 Summer Olympics in Athens, Greece, where the team ended up in fifth place in the overall-rankings.

References

External links
 

1976 births
Living people
Australian female field hockey players
Olympic field hockey players of Australia
Field hockey players at the 2002 Commonwealth Games
Field hockey players at the 2004 Summer Olympics
People from Goulburn
Commonwealth Games bronze medallists for Australia
Commonwealth Games medallists in field hockey
21st-century Australian women
Sportswomen from New South Wales
Field hockey people from New South Wales
Medallists at the 2002 Commonwealth Games